Ulrich's Periodicals Directory (and ) is the standard library directory and database providing information about popular and academic magazines, scientific journals, newspapers and other serial publications.

The print version has been published since 1932, and was founded by Carolyn F. Ulrich, chief of the periodicals division of the New York Public Library as Periodicals Directory: A Classified Guide to a Selected List of Current Periodicals Foreign and Domestic.

It is now also supplied on-line as Ulrichsweb, which provides web-based and Z39.50 linking to library catalogs. The online version includes over 300,000 active and current periodicals.

Coverage is international, with some emphasis on English-language publications. The information is derived from the publishers and verified by the journal. It includes 
ISSN
Title and previous titles
Starting date, place of publication, and publisher
Cost, availability of electronic versions, subscription terms, and approximate circulation as estimated by the publisher
Subject information, searchable as subject terms or approximate Dewey Classification, special features, and indexing information
Indications of whether the publication is available on open access 
Indication of whether the publication is peer-reviewed, which is taken to include professional magazines with equivalent editorial control of quality.

Earlier published by R.R. Bowker, it moved to CSA, a fellow subsidiary of Cambridge Information Group, in 2006.  Following the merger of CSA and ProQuest, Ulrich's moved to ProQuest subsidiary Serials Solutions. The "Serials Solutions" name was retired in 2014

See also 

 List of academic databases and search engines

References

External links
 
 Ulrichs web Global Serials Directory (about Ulrichweb and FAQ)
 Dialog Bluesheet for Ulrich's Periodicals Directory

Bibliographic databases and indexes
ProQuest